Silk Street Bridge is a historic Lenticular pony truss bridge located at Newark Valley in Tioga County, New York.   It was constructed in 1888 and spans the East Branch of Owego Creek.  It was constructed by the Berlin Iron Bridge Company of East Berlin, Connecticut. The bridge is currently closed to traffic.

It was listed on the National Register of Historic Places in 1998.

References

Road bridges on the National Register of Historic Places in New York (state)
Bridges completed in 1888
Buildings and structures in Tioga County, New York
Transportation in Tioga County, New York
National Register of Historic Places in Tioga County, New York
Lenticular truss bridges in the United States
Metal bridges in the United States